{{DISPLAYTITLE:ATPase, Na+/K+ transporting, alpha 1}}

Sodium/potassium-transporting ATPase subunit alpha-1 is an enzyme that in humans is encoded by the ATP1A1 gene.

The protein encoded by this gene belongs to the family of P-type cation transport ATPases, and to the subfamily of Na+/K+-ATPases. Na+/K+-ATPase is an integral membrane protein responsible for establishing and maintaining the electrochemical gradients of Na and K ions across the plasma membrane. These gradients are essential for osmoregulation, for sodium-coupled transport of a variety of organic and inorganic molecules, and for electrical excitability of nerve and muscle. This enzyme is composed of two subunits, a large catalytic subunit (alpha) and a smaller glycoprotein subunit (beta). The catalytic subunit of Na+/K+-ATPase is encoded by multiple genes. This gene encodes an alpha 1 subunit. Alternatively spliced transcript variants encoding different isoforms have been identified.

In melanocytic cells ATP1A1 gene expression may be regulated by MITF.

Clinical relevance
Mutations in this gene have been associated with aldosterone-producing adenomas and secondary hypertension.

References

Further reading